Seibert is a surname of German origin. It comes from the German personal name Seibert, which is derived from one of three related "battle names" which were originally spelled Siegfried, Siegbert, and Sigismund; translating as "Victory-Peace", "Victory-Bright", and "Victory-Strength".

Seibert, originally spelled Siegbert, means "Victory-Bright", taken from the combination of two root words sigi and berht. Used as a last name it is often Ashkenazi Jewish (by adopting the German personal name as a surname) and is often a variant spelling of Seifert which is used as a Jewish acronym for Sefer Torah (Scroll or Scribe of the Torah). The Seibert/Seifert name may have something to do with the kabbalistic Sephirot, as well.

The Seibert family shield depicts a background azure, two Stars of David argent in the upper corners, and a chevron argent in the base. Heraldry books describe the six-pointed stars as "emblems of God", and the chevron is a symbol for "those who served under the roof of a house". The heraldic color silver depicts "purity", "sincerity", and "the moon". The colour blue depicts "royalty", "peace", and "heavenly ascent".

List of people surnamed Seibert
Austin Seibert (born 1997), American football player
Donald Seibert (1922–2003), American college football coach
Earl Seibert (1910–1990), Canadian professional ice hockey player
Florence B. Seibert (1897–1991), American biochemist
Fred Seibert (born 1951), American television producer
Kurt Seibert (born 1955), American baseball player
Lloyd Seibert (1889–1972), American soldier; recipient of the Medal of Honor for action in World War I
Margo Seibert, American actress
Mark Seibert (contemporary), American musician; composer of music for video games
Michael Seibert (born 1960), American champion figure skater
Oliver Seibert (1881–1944), Canadian ice hockey player
Pete Seibert (1924–2002), American founder of Vail Ski Resort
Robert Seibert (contemporary), American professor of political science and political commentator
Simon Seibert (1857–1917), New York politician
Steffen Seibert (born 1960), German journalist and press secretary of the Chancellor's office.

Surnames from given names